Ana Paula may refer to:
Ana Paula (footballer), Brazilian women's association football forward
Ana Paula Alves (born 1970), Brazilian sitting volleyball player
Ana Paula Araújo (model) (born 1981), Brazilian model
Ana Paula Araújo (newscaster) (born 1972), Brazilian newscaster and journalist
Ana Paula Arendt (born 1980), pseudonym of R. P. Alencar, Brazilian writer and diplomat
Ana Paula Arósio (born 1975), Brazilian model and actress
Ana Paula Belo (born 1987), Brazilian handball player
Ana Paula Campos (born 1994), Brazilian badminton player
Ana Paula Connelly (born 1972), Brazilian volleyball player
Ana Paula De Alencar (born 1992), Brazilian group rhythmic gymnast
Ana Paula de la Peña (born 1988), Mexican tennis player
Ana Paula de Tassis (born 1965), Italian volleyball player
Ana Paula dos Santos (born 1963), former First Lady of Angola
Ana Paula Höfling, American dance researcher
Ana Paula Lopes (born 1959), Toronto-based entrepreneur
Ana Paula Oliveira (born 1978), Brazilian football assistant referee, model and TV presenter
Ana Paula Padrão (born 1965), Brazilian journalist and television host
Ana Paula Pereira da Silva Villela (born 1997), Brazilian footballer
Ana Paula Ribeiro (born 1989), Brazilian group rhythmic gymnast
Ana Paula Ribeiro Tavares (born 1952), Angolan poet
Ana Paula Valadão (born 1976), Brazilian Christian worship leader and singer-songwriter
Ana Paula Vitorino (born 1962), Portuguese politician
Ana Paula Zacarias (born 1959), Portuguese diplomat